The 1952 Alexander Cup was the Canadian national major ('open' to both amateur and professional leagues) senior ice hockey championship for the 1951–52 season.

Final
The Quebec Aces, of the amateur Quebec Senior Hockey League, defeated the Saint John Beavers, of the semi-professional Maritime Major Hockey League (MMHL), 4 games to 1.

Best of 7:
Quebec 4 Saint John 1
Quebec 5 Saint John 3
Quebec 4 Saint John 2
Saint John 6 Quebec 0
Quebec 5 Saint John 2

External links
 Hockey Canada
 MMHL Seasons at hockeydb.com

Alex